A small-lift launch vehicle is a rocket orbital launch vehicle that is capable of lifting  or less (by NASA classification) or under  (by Roscosmos classification) of payload into low Earth orbit (LEO). The next larger category consists of medium-lift launch vehicles.

The first small-lift launch vehicle was the Sputnik rocket, launched by the Soviet Union, which was derived from the R-7 Semyorka ICBM. On 4 October 1957, the Sputnik rocket was used to perform the world's first satellite launch, placing the Sputnik 1 satellite into a low Earth orbit.
NASA responded by attempting to launch the Vanguard rocket. However, the Vanguard TV3 launch attempt failed, with the 31 January 1958 launch of the Explorer 1 satellite using the Juno I rocket being the first successful NASA orbital launch. The Vanguard I mission was the second successful NASA orbital launch. This was the start of the space race.

Since the late 1950s, small-lift launch vehicles have continued launching payloads to space. Medium-lift launch vehicles, heavy-lift launch vehicles, and super heavy-lift launch vehicles have also been extensively developed but have not completely been able to supersede the small launch vehicles. Small launch vehicles can meet the requirements of some spacecraft, and can also be less expensive than a larger launch vehicle would be.

Rated launch vehicles

See also
 Sounding rocket, suborbital launch vehicle
 Medium-lift launch vehicle, capable of lifting between 2,000 and 20,000 kg to low Earth orbit
 Heavy lift launch vehicle, capable of lifting between 20,000 and 50,000 kg to low Earth orbit
 Super heavy-lift launch vehicles, capable of lifting more than 50,000 kg (110,000 lb) of payload into LEO
 Comparison of orbital launch systems
 List of orbital launch systems
 Comparison of orbital rocket engines
 Comparison of space station cargo vehicles
 Rocket
 Spacecraft propulsion

References

Notes

Further reading
 Isakowitz, Hopkins, and Hopkins International Guide to Space Launch Systems, AIAA. .

External links
 Small Satellite Launchers at NewSpace Index

Space launch vehicles
Microsatellite launch vehicles